The Asociación Nacional de Scouts de Panamá is a Panamanian youth scouting organization founded in 1924 and accepted into the World Organization of the Scout Movement (WOSM) that same year. Although WOSM recognition was withdrawn in 1936, Panama regained membership in 1950. Panamanian Scouting is coeducational. In 2010, the organization had 1,775 Scouts. 

Scouts are involved in community service projects such as disaster relief, conservation of natural resources, and collection of toys and games for impoverished children.

Scouting

Programs 
Cubs-ages 6 to 10
Scouts-ages 11 to 14
Caminantes (walks)-15 to 17
Rovers -18 to 20

The highest award for Scouts  is the Scout Balboa, changed from the former Scout Urraca, for a local indigenous leader who fought Spanish conquistadores.

The membership badge of the Asociación Nacional de Scouts de Panamá incorporates elements of the flag of Panama, superimposed with a bust of the Spanish explorer/conquistador Vasco Núñez de Balboa.

Motto 

Siempre listo, Always ready.

Oath 
Prometo hacer cuanto de mi dependa para: Amar a Dios, Servir a mi Pais, Trabajar por la Paz y vivir la Ley Scout

I promise to do as much as I can to: Love God, Serve my Country, Work for Peace and live the Scout Law

Law 
El Scout cifra su honor en ser digno de confianza
El Scout es leal para con Dios su patria, sus padres, jefes y subordinados
El Scout es útil y ayuda a los demás sin pensar en recompensa
El Scout es amigo de todos y hermano de todo Scout sin distinción de credo, raza, nacionalidad o clase social
El Scout es cortés y caballeroso
El Scout ve en la naturaleza la obra de Dios, proteje a los animales y plantas
El Scout obedece sin replicar y hace las cosas en orden y completas
El Scout sonríe y canta en sus dificultades
El Scout es económico, trabajador y cuidadoso del bien ajeno
El Scout es limpio y sano, puro en sus pensamientos, palabras y acciones
The Scout figures his honor in being trustworthy
The Scout is loyal to God his country, his parents, bosses and subordinates
The Scout is useful and helps others without thinking of reward
The Scout is friends of all and brother of all Scout without distinction of creed, race, nationality or social class
The Scout is courteous and chivalrous
The Scout sees the work of God in nature, protects the animals and plants
The Scout obeys without replying and makes things in order and complete
The Scout smiles and sings in his difficulties
The Scout is economic, hard-working and careful of the good of others
The Scout is clean and healthy, pure in his thoughts, words and actions

See also 

 Asociación de Muchachas Guías de Panamá

References

External links
 

World Organization of the Scout Movement member organizations
Scouting and Guiding in Panama

Youth organizations established in 1924
1924 establishments in Panama